Mekong Auto Corporation headquartered in Ho Chi Minh City, Vietnam, is a car manufacturer and assembler founded in 1991. The first car was built at the Delta Auto Plant on May 20, 1992. Japanese Saeilo Machinery Japan Inc. is the major shareholder of the company, owning 51%.  The company opened Co Loa Auto Plant in Ha Noi City in 1993. The company works with Fiat S.p.A. (Fiat cars and Iveco trucks), Pyeonghwa Motors and SsangYong.

Products

Mekong
Mekong Stars-4WD (1992-1997)

Fiat
Fiat Siena (1997-2005)
Fiat Tempra (1995-2002)
Fiat Doblò (2000-2007)
Fiat Albea (2002-2007)
Fiat Grande Punto (2005-2018)
Fiat 500 (since 2007)
Fiat Bravo (2007-2017)

SsangYong
SsangYong Korando (1997-2005)
SsangYong Musso (1997-1999)
SsangYong Musso Libero (1999-2005)

Pyeonghwa Motors
Pyeonghwa Premio DX (2004-2009)
Pyeonghwa Premio MAX (since 2007)
Pyeonghwa Pronto DX (2004-2009)
Pyeonghwa Premio DX II (since 2009)
Pyeonghwa Pronto GS (since 2009)

References

External links
Mekong Auto

Car manufacturers of Vietnam
Vehicle manufacturing companies established in 1991
Manufacturing companies based in Ho Chi Minh City
Vietnamese brands
Vietnamese companies established in 1991